DYBQ (981 AM) Radyo Budyong is a radio station owned and operated by Intercontinental Broadcasting Corporation. Its studio is located at Datu Puti Subdivision, Brgy. Cubay, Jaro, Iloilo City.

References

Radio stations established in 1987
Radio stations in Iloilo City
News and talk radio stations in the Philippines
Intercontinental Broadcasting Corporation
IBC News and Public Affairs